Spatuloricaria phelpsi is a species of catfish in the family Loricariidae. It is native to South America, where it occurs in the Lake Maracaibo basin in Venezuela, with its type locality reportedly being the Socuy River. The species reaches 33.8 cm (13.3 inches) in standard length and is known to feed on algae and detritus.

References 

Loricariidae
Fish described in 1944
Catfish of South America
Fish of Venezuela
Taxa named by Leonard Peter Schultz